The 1910 The Citadel Bulldogs football team represented The Citadel as a member of Southern Intercollegiate Athletic Association (SIAA) during the 1910 college football season. This was the sixth year of intercollegiate football at The Citadel, with Sam Costen serving as coach for the second season. All home games are believed to have been played at College Park Stadium in Hampton Park.

Schedule

References

Citadel
The Citadel Bulldogs football seasons
Citadel Bulldogs football